A combo drive is a type of optical drive that combines CD-R/CD-RW recording capability with an ability to read (but not write) DVD media; some manufacturers refer this as CD-RW/DVD-ROM drive. The term is used almost exclusively by Apple Inc. as a name for the low-end substitute for their high-end SuperDrive, as the latter was designed to both read and write CD and DVD recordable media. The device was created as a mid-range option between a CD burner and a DVD burner, which at the time the combo drive was introduced was generally an expensive option costing in excess of US$300 a unit.

Combo drives are becoming less and less common on new systems, though they do occasionally appear in lieu of CD-only drives on low-end computers and business computers to lower production and sale costs.  The cost difference between a combo drive and DVD burner has been steadily declining in recent years, so most new PCs (except for the low-end budget computers) have a DVD burner (which also reads and writes CDs).

In current Apple computers, none of them contain combo drives. As of October 2008, the MacBook comes with a SuperDrive as standard, and as of March 2009, the Mac mini comes with a SuperDrive as opposed to the usual combo drive.

More recently the term "combo drive" is used to refer to an optical drive that can read & write CDs and DVDs, but only read Blu-ray Disc/BD-ROM; some manufacturers refer this as Blu-Ray Disc combo drive or BD-ROM/DVD±RW/CD-RW drive.

IBM has launched UltraSlim Enhanced SATA Combo Drive. These are newest storage solutions for servers that need high-storage capacity for data backup and mission-critical applications.

References

External links
 Example of a barebone combo (CD-RW/DVD-ROM) drive for desktop PC, made by Sony.
 Overview - UltraSlim Enhanced SATA Combo Drive and UltraSlim Enhanced SATA Multi-Burner

Optical computer storage